Egelner Mulde is a Verbandsgemeinde ("collective municipality") in the Salzlandkreis district, in Saxony-Anhalt, Germany. Before 1 January 2010, it was a Verwaltungsgemeinschaft. The seat of the Verbandsgemeinde is in Egeln.

The Verbandsgemeinde Egelner Mulde consists of the following municipalities:

 Bördeaue 
 Börde-Hakel 
 Borne 
 Egeln
 Wolmirsleben

References

Verbandsgemeinden in Saxony-Anhalt